CBO may stand for:

 Chief business officer, the top operating strategy executive of a commercial company, or academic/research institution
 Chief brand officer, another title for the Chief marketing officer
 CBO-FM, a CBC Radio One station in Ottawa, Ontario, Canada
 Central Bank of Oman, established in December 1974 and began operations on 1 April 1975
 Combined Bomber Offensive, an Anglo-American offensive of strategic bombing during World War II in Europe
 Community-based organization
 Congressional Budget Office, United States federal agency responsible for government budget calculations and analyses
 Criminal behaviour order, a court order issued in England and Wales designed to change the behaviour of convicts
 Central Boycott Office, an agency facilitating the Arab League boycott of Israel
 City of Birmingham Orchestra, the original name of the City of Birmingham Symphony Orchestra
 Collateralized bond obligation, a type of collateralized debt obligation
 Columbium oxide (CbO), an alternate name for niobium oxide
 CBO, a sandwich sold by McDonald's in some countries

See also 
 C-Bo (born 1974), American rapper
 SVO (disambiguation)